The 2005 NCAA Division I Outdoor Track and Field Championships were contested at the 84th annual NCAA-sanctioned track meet to determine the individual and team champions of men's and women's Division I collegiate outdoor track and field in the United States.

This year's meet, the 24th with both men's and women's championships, was held June 11–14, 2005 at Hornet Stadium at Sacramento State University in Sacramento, California. 

Two-time defending champions Arkansas won the men's title, although the Razorbacks' win would later be vacated by the NCAA (alongside their 2004 victory). No other team has since been awarded the title.

Texas won the women's title, the Longhorns' fourth and first since 1999.

Team results 
 Note: Top 10 only
 (DC) = Defending champions
Full results

Men's standings

Women's standings

References

NCAA Men's Outdoor Track and Field Championship
NCAA Division I Outdoor Track And Field Championships
NCAA Division I Outdoor Track And Field Championships
NCAA Division I Outdoor Track and Field Championships
NCAA Women's Outdoor Track and Field Championship